Afansie Butelchin is a Romanian sprint canoer who competed in the late 1960s and early 1970s. He won the silver medal in the C-1 10000 m event at the 1970 ICF Canoe Sprint World Championships in Copenhagen.

References

Notes

Living people
Romanian male canoeists
Year of birth missing (living people)
ICF Canoe Sprint World Championships medalists in Canadian